Donald Sutherland (born 1935) is a Canadian actor.

Donald Sutherland may also refer to:

Donald Sutherland (cricketer) (born 1949), Australian cricketer
Donald Sutherland (explorer) (1843/1844–1919), New Zealand explorer 
Donald Sutherland (politician) (1863–1949), member of Canadian Parliament for the Oxford South riding
Donald Matheson Sutherland (1879–1970), member of Canadian Parliament for the Oxford North riding
Donald Sutherland, co-founder, with his wife Susan, of Cold Stone Creamery
Donald Sutherland, a variant of the Rusty Nail cocktail